Gusztáv Pártos (18 August 1895, Pusztaszentbenedek – 22 March 1951, Budapest) was a Hungarian actor.

Selected filmography
 Lord Arthur Saville's Crime (1920)
 The Black Captain (1920)
 Arsene Lupin's Last Adventure (1922)
 The Private Life of Helen of Troy (1927)
 Lonesome (1928)
 Vamping Venus (1928)
 Night Watch (1928)
 Close Harmony (1929)
 The Last Performance (1929)
 Villa for Sale (1935)
 Rozmaring (1938)
 Duel for Nothing (1940)
 Csalódás (1943)

External links

1895 births
1951 deaths
Hungarian male film actors
Hungarian male silent film actors
20th-century Hungarian male actors